Kenny Williams may refer to:
Kenny Williams (announcer) (1914–1984), American television announcer
Kenny Williams (baseball) (born 1964), Chicago White Sox Executive Vice President
Kenny Williams (basketball, born 1969), American basketball player, for the Indiana Pacers
Kenny Williams (basketball, born 1972), American basketball player, who played for UIC Flames
Kenny Williams (basketball, born 1996), American basketball player, who played for the North Carolina Tar Heels
Kenny Williams (bowls), Australian lawn and indoor bowler
Kenny Williams (cyclist), American racing cyclist
Kenny Williams (educator) (1927–2003), American author and English professor
Kenny Williams (wrestler) (born 1988), Scottish professional wrestler
Kenny Bruce Williams, a fictional character in the Left Behind series

See also 
Ken Williams (disambiguation)